Sambo Tumang Forest Park is a forest park in the Gambia. It covers 45 hectares.

It is located in the Central River region at an altitude of nine meters.

References

Forest parks of the Gambia